Pyaemia (or pyemia) is a type of sepsis that leads to widespread abscesses of a metastatic nature.  It is usually caused by the staphylococcus bacteria by pus-forming organisms in the blood. Apart from the distinctive abscesses, pyaemia exhibits the same symptoms as other forms of septicaemia. It was almost universally fatal before the introduction of antibiotics.

Sir William Osler included a three-page discussion of pyaemia in his textbook The Principles and Practice of Medicine, published in 1892. He defined pyaemia as follows:

Earlier still, Ignaz Semmelweis – who later died of the disease – included a section titled "Childbed fever is a variety of pyaemia" in his treatise, The Etiology of Childbed Fever (1861). Jane Grey Swisshelm, in her autobiography titled Half a Century, describes the treatment of pyaemia in 1862 during the American Civil War.

Types
arterial p.  Pyaemia resulting from dissemination of emboli from a thrombus in cardiac vessels.
cryptogenic p.  Pyaemia of an origin that is hidden in the deeper tissues.
metastatic p.  Multiple abscesses resulting from infected pyaemic thrombi.
portal p.  Suppurative inflammation of the portal vein.

Symptoms 

The disease is characterized by intermittent high temperature with recurrent chills; metastatic processes in various parts of the body, especially in the lungs; septic pneumonia; empyema.  It may be fatal. 
Clinical sign and symptoms can be differ according to system it involves.

Diagnosis
features of systemic inflammatory response syndrome tachycardia >90beats/min 
tachypnea >24/min
temperature >38 or <36

Treatment 
Antibiotics are effective.  Prophylactic treatment consists in prevention of suppuration.

Cultural references

 Ignaz Semmelweis, the original proponent of hand-washing in the practice of medicine, was widely scorned for his belief and was committed to an insane asylum where he died at age 47 of pyaemia, after being beaten by the guards, only 14 days after he was committed.
 The nihilistic character Bazarov in Ivan Turgenev's Fathers and Sons dies of pyaemia.
 Miller Huggins, manager of the New York Yankees, died of pyaemia while managing the team during the 1929 season.
 Blind Boy Fuller died at his home in Durham, North Carolina on February 13, 1941, at 5 p.m. of pyemia due to an infected bladder, gastrointestinal tract and perineum, plus kidney failure.
 Casper, a wounded soldier in "Nostalgia," by Dennis McFarland, is dying of pyemia after his lower arm is amputated.

References

External links 

Bacterial diseases